Sir George Orby Wombwell, 4th Baronet (23 November 1832 – 16 October 1913) was a British baronet.

Early life
Wombwell was born on 23 November 1832.  He was the son of Sir George Wombwell, 3rd Baronet and educated at Eton College and Royal Military College, Sandhurst.

Career
He joined the 17th Lancers in 1852 as a cornet and served as an aide-de-camp to Lord Cardigan. He was a survivor of the Charge of the Light Brigade. When he had reached the guns, his horse was killed under him and he was shortly after pulled off and taken prisoner, his sword and pistols being taken from him by some Russian Lancers. He managed to escape, catch another loose horse and ride back to the British lines, hotly pursued by Russians.

He retired from the Army as a lieutenant in 1855, when he inherited his title and Newburgh Priory, the old seat of the Belasyses, in Coxwold, North Yorkshire, on the death of his father. Included in this estate was Over Silton Manor, where Wombwell's initials (GOW) can still be seen on one of the manor cottages, and High House, at Thornton-on-the-Hill.

He was appointed High Sheriff of Yorkshire in 1861.

Personal life
He married Lady Julia Sarah Alice Child-Villiers, daughter of George Child-Villiers, 6th Earl of Jersey and Julia Peel, on 3 September 1861. They had two sons, who both died on active service, and three daughters:
 George Wombwell (1865–1889), a lieutenant with the King's Royal Rifle Corps, died at Meerut in India
 Stephen Frederick Wombwell (1867–1901), a lieutenant in the Yorkshire Hussars, died of Enteric fever at Vryburg in South Africa during the Second Boer War while serving as a captain with the Imperial Yeomanry.
 Julia Georgiana Wombwell (b. 1862), who married firstly Vesey Dawson, 2nd Earl of Dartrey in 1890 and secondly, late in life, John St Aubyn, 2nd Baron St Levan.
 Mabel Caroline Wombwell (b.1863) who married Henry Robert Hohler.
 Cecilia Clementina Wombwell (b. 1864) who married William Menzies.

At his death he was the last surviving officer of the Charge of the Light Brigade and was buried in Coxwold churchyard. His title and 12,000 acre estate passed to his younger brother Henry Herbert Wombwell.

Picture of 4th Baronet
Painting of Sir George Wombwell, 4th Baronet

References

Bibliography

External links 
 
 http://www.peerage.com

1832 births
1913 deaths
People educated at Eton College
Graduates of the Royal Military College, Sandhurst
17th Lancers officers
Baronets in the Baronetage of Great Britain
British Army personnel of the Crimean War
High Sheriffs of Yorkshire